The Venezuelan U-20 women's national football team are the national women's under-20 football team of Venezuela. They are controlled by the Federación Venezolana de Fútbol.

Records

U-20 World Cup record

South American Championship record

Players

Latest squad
Squad for the 2018 South American U-20 Women's Championship. Players who were born from 2000 onwards are still eligible for selection.

See also
 Venezuela women's national football team (Senior)
 Football in Venezuela

References

External links
 Venezuela Football Association Website

F
u-20 National
South American women's national under-20 association football teams